Kanaka Herath is a Sri Lankan politician, former cabinet minister, and a member of the Parliament of Sri Lanka. He belongs to the Sri Lanka Podujana Peramuna. He was appointed as the Minister of Highways on the 18th of April 2022. He served until 9 May 2022 following another mass resignation of the Sri Lankan cabinet.

References

Members of the 14th Parliament of Sri Lanka
Members of the 15th Parliament of Sri Lanka
Members of the 16th Parliament of Sri Lanka
Sri Lanka Podujana Peramuna politicians
Sri Lanka Freedom Party politicians
United People's Freedom Alliance politicians
Living people
1976 births
Sinhalese politicians